Robert Duncombe Shafto (1806 – 22 March 1889) was a British Liberal Party politician.  He was Member of Parliament (MP) for North Durham from 1847 to 1868.

References

External links 
 

1796 births
1888 deaths
Liberal Party (UK) MPs for English constituencies
People from County Durham
UK MPs 1847–1852
UK MPs 1852–1857
UK MPs 1857–1859
UK MPs 1859–1865
UK MPs 1865–1868